The men's 1500 metres event at the 1991 Pan American Games was held in Havana, Cuba on 4 and 5 August.

Results

Heats

Final

References

Athletics at the 1991 Pan American Games
1991